Main Building, Mitchell College is a historic building located on the campus of Mitchell Community College at Statesville, Iredell County, North Carolina.  It was built in 1854–1856, and is a three-story stuccoed brick building with a heroic hexastyle Doric order portico in the Greek Revival style.  It is T-shaped in plan, 13 bays wide and 3 bays deep, with a five-bay-deep and three-bay-wide wing.  Atop the roof is an octagonal wooden cupola.  An east wing, Shearer Music Hall, was added to the structure in 1907.

It was listed on the National Register of Historic Places in 1973.  It is located in the Mitchell College Historic District.

References

University and college buildings on the National Register of Historic Places in North Carolina
Greek Revival architecture in North Carolina
School buildings completed in 1856
Buildings and structures in Iredell County, North Carolina
National Register of Historic Places in Iredell County, North Carolina
Historic district contributing properties in North Carolina
University and college administration buildings in the United States